Atlanta Public Schools (APS) is a school district based in Atlanta, Georgia, United States. It is run by the Atlanta Board of Education with superintendent Dr. Lisa Herring. The system has an active enrollment of 54,956 students, attending a total of 103 school sites: 50 elementary schools (three of which operate on a year-round calendar), 15 middle schools, 21 high schools, four single-gender academies and 13 charter schools.  The school system also supports two alternative schools for middle and/or high school students, two community schools, and an adult learning center.

The school system owns the license for, but does not operate, the radio station WABE-FM 90.1 (the National Public Radio affiliate) and the Public Broadcasting Service (PBS) public television station WABE-TV 30.

Governance
The Atlanta Board of Education establishes and approves the policies that govern the Atlanta Public School system. The board consists of nine members, representing six geographical districts, and three "at-large" districts. One person is elected per district to represent the schools in a given district for a four-year term.  Under the provisions of the new board charter, approved by the Georgia Legislature in 2003, board members elect a new chairman and vice chairman every two years. The day-to-day administration of the school district is the responsibility of the superintendent, who is appointed by the board.

School board members

 District 1 - Leslie Grant
 District 2 - Aretta Baldon
 District 3 - Michelle Olympiadis
 District 4 - Nancy Meister
 District 5 - Erica Mitchell
 District 6 - Eshe' Collins (Vice-Chair)
 Seat 7 - Kandis Wood Jackson
 Seat 8 - Cynthia Briscoe Brown
 Seat 9 - Jason Esteves (Chair)

https://www.atlantapublicschools.us/domain/11326

APS leadership
2020-2021 school year

 Dr. Lisa Herring, Ed.D., Superintendent
 Steve Smith, Associate Superintendent
 Karen Waldon, Deputy Superintendent for Curriculum and Instruction
 Lisa Bracken, Chief Financial Officer
 D. Glenn Brock, General Counsel (Nelson, Mullins, Riley & Scarborough LLP)
 Larry Hoskins, Deputy Superintendent for Operations
 Alexis Kirijan, Ed.D., Chief Strategy Officer
 Tony Hunter, Chief Information Officer
 Ron Price, Chief Human Resources Officer

Schools

High schools

Benjamin E. Mays High School
BEST Academy High School
Booker T. Washington High School
Coretta Scott King Young Women's Leadership Academy High School
Daniel McLaughlin Therrell High School
Frederick Douglass High School
Maynard H. Jackson High School
Midtown High School (formerly Henry W. Grady High School)
The New Schools at Carver
 Early College
 School of the Arts
 School of Health Sciences & Research
 School of Technology
North Atlanta High School
South Atlanta High School

Middle schools

 BEST Academy Middle School
 Coretta Scott King Young Women's Leadership Academy Middle School
 Crawford Williamson Long Middle School
 Jean Childs Young Middle School
 Joseph Emerson Brown Middle School
 Luther Judson Price Middle School
 Martin Luther King Jr. Middle School
 Ralph Johnson Bunche Middle School
 Samuel M. Inman Middle School (now David T. Howard Middle School )
 Sylvan Hills Middle School
 Sutton Middle 
 Willis Sutton Middle School

Elementary schools
 Adamsville Elementary School
 Barack & Michelle Obama Academy (formerly DH Stanton Elementary)
 Beecher Hills Elementary School
 Benteen Elementary School
 Bethune Elementary School
 Bolton Academy
 Boyd Elementary School
 Brandon Elementary School
 Burgess/Peterson Elementary School
 Cascade Elementary School
 Centennial Academy Elementary School
 Cleveland Avenue Elementary School
 Connally Elementary School
 Continental Colony Elementary School
 Deerwood Academy
 Dobbs Elementary School
 Dunbar Elementary School
 Fain Elementary School
 Fickett Elementary School
 Finch Elementary School
 Frank Lebby Stanton Elementary School
 Fred A. Toomer Elementary School
 Flat Rock Elementary School 
 Garden Hills Elementary School
 Gideons Elementary School
 Grove Park Intermediate Elementary School
 Harper-Archer Elementary School
 Heritage Academy
 Hope-Hill Elementary School
 Humphries Elementary School
 Hutchinson Elementary School
 Jackson Elementary School
 Kimberly Elementary School
 M. Agnes Jones Elementary School
 Mary Lin Elementary School
 Miles Elementary School
 Morningside Elementary School
 Oglethorpe Elementary School
 Parkside Elementary School
 Perkerson Elementary School
 Peyton Forest Elementary School
 Pine Ridge Elementary School 
 Rivers Elementary School
 Sarah Smith Elementary School
 Scott Elementary School
 Slater Elementary School
 Springdale Park Elementary School
 Sycamore Elementary school
 Thomasville Heights Elementary School
 Towns Elementary School
 Bazoline E. Usher Collier Heights Elementary School
 Venetian Hills Elementary School
 West Manor Elementary School
 Whitefoord Elementary School
 Woodson Primary Elementary School
Tag Academy

Non-traditional schools
 Alonzo A. Crim Open Campus High School
 APS/Community Education Partnership (CEP) School
 The New School of Atlanta
 West End Academy
 Hank Aaron New Beginnings Academy - It was Forrest Hill Academy, named after Nathan Bedford Forrest, until 2021.

Single-gender academies
 The B.E.S.T. Academy at Benjamin S. Carson (Business, Engineering, Science, and Technology)
 The Coretta Scott King Young Women's Leadership Academy

Evening school programs
 Adult Literacy Program

Charter schools
 Atlanta Classical Academy
 Atlanta Neighborhood Charter School
 Centennial Academy
 Charles R. Drew Charter School
 The Kindezi School
 KIPP Vision Academy 
 KIPP Vision Primary 
 KIPP West Atlanta Young Scholars Academy
 The Latin Academy 
 University Community Academy, an Atlanta Charter School, Inc.
 Wesley International Academy
 Westside Atlanta Charter School

Former schools

High schools
 Boys High School, 1872-1947
 Charles Lincoln Harper High School, 1963-1995
 Commercial High School, 1888-1947
 Daniel O'Keefe High School, 1947-1973
 David T. Howard High School, 1945-1976
 East Atlanta High School, 1959-1988
 Franklin D. Roosevelt High School, 1947-1985
 Fulton High School, 1915-1994
 Girls High School, 1872-1947
 Harper-Archer High School, 1995-2002
 Henry McNeal Turner High School, 1951-1990
 Hoke Smith High School, 1947-1985
 Joseph Emerson Brown High School, 1947-1992
 Luther Judson Price High School, 1954-1987
 North Fulton High School, 1920-1991
 Northside High School, 1950-1991
 Samuel Howard Archer High School, 1950-1995
 Southwest High School, 1950-1981
 Sylvan Hills High School, 1949-1987
 Tech High Charter School, 2004-2012
 Technological "Tech" High School, 1909-1947
 Walter F. George High School, 1959-1995
 West Fulton High School, 1947-1992
 William A. Bass High School, 1948-1987
 William F. Dykes High School, 1959-1973
 J.C. Murphy High School, 1949-1988

Middle schools
 Austin T. Walden Middle School
 Central Junior High School
 Daniel O'keefe Middle School, 1973-1983
 Henry McNeal Turner Middle School, 1989-2010
 John Fitzgerald Kennedy Middle School
 Marshall Middle School
 Sammye E. Coan Middle School
 Walter Leonard Parks Middle School
 West Fulton Middle School, 1992-2004
 CW Long Middle School

Elementary schools
 Adair Park Elementary School
 Anderson Park Elementary School, added to APS in 1951 (previously out of district)
 Anne E. West Elementary School
 Arkwright Elementary School
 Bell Street School, 1900-
 Ben Hill Elementary School
 Blair Village Elementary School                                                                             
 Blalock Elementary School
 Boulevard School(Beerman Lot), 1888 (additional rooms added in 1891) -
 Burgess Elementary School
 C.D. Hubert Elementary School, renamed Atlanta Tech High in 2004
 Calhoun Street, 1883-
 Capitol View Elementary School
 Caroline F. Harper Elementary School
 Center Hill Elementary School
 Chattahoochee Elementary School
 Clark Howell Elementary School
 Collier Heights Elementary School
 Cook Elementary School
 Crew Street Elementary School, 1872- (burned 1885, rebuilt)
 Dean Rusk Elementary
 D.F. McClatchey Elementary School
 Davis Street, 1887
 Decatur Street Elementary School, 1872-1876?
 East Lake Elementary School
 Edgewood Avenue, 1892-
 Edmond Asa Ware Elementary School
 Edwin P. Johnson Elementary School
 Emma Clarissa Clement Elementary School
 English Avenue Elementary School
 Evan P. Howell Elementary School
 Fair Street School, 1880-
 Formwalt School, 1893
 Fountain Elementary School
 Fourth Ward School (on Boulevard), 1902-
 Fowler St. Elementary School
 Fraser Street, 1891-
 Gray Street, 1888-
 Grant Park School, 1904-
H. R. Butler Elementary School (Young Street School)

 Haynes Street School, 1873-
 Harwell Elementary School
 Herndon Elementary School
 Home Park Elementary School
 Houston Street School, 1880-
 I.N. Ragsdale Elementary School
 Ira Street, 1885-
 Ivy Street Elementary School, 1872-
 Joel Chandler Harris Elementary School
 John B. Gordon Elementary school
 John Carey Elementary School
 John F. Faith Elementary, renamed C.D. Hubert in 1963 
 John P. Whittaker Elementary School
 Jonathan M. Goldsmith Elementary School                                                                                               
 Lakewood Elementary School
 Laura Haygood Elementary School
 Lee Street Elementary School (Previously West End School, renamed 1904), annexed into APS in 1894-
 Luckie Street Elementary School, 1872-
 Marietta Street Elementary School, 1873-
 Margaret Mitchell Elementary School
 Minnie S. Howell Elementary School
 Mitchell Street, 1882-
 Moreland Ave. Elementary School
 Mount Vernon Elementary School
 North Ave. Elementary School, 1908
 Oglethorpe Elementary School
 Peeples Street Grammar School
 Pryor Street School, 1907-
 Riverside Elementary School
 Roach Street, 1892
 Rockdale Elementary School
 Rosalie Wright Elementary School
 Spring Street Elementary School
 State Street, 1891
 Storr's School, opened 1866, added to APS 1872
 Summer Hill School, opened 1866, added to APS 1872
 Sylvan Hills Elementary School
 Tenth Street School, 1905-
 Thomas Jefferson Guice Elementary School
 Walker Street Elementary School, 1872-
 Waters Elementary School
 West End School (on Peeples St.), 1904
 William Franklin Hartnett (Hardnett) Elementary School, 1955-1985 (burned)
 William Franklin Slaton School (originally referred to as Grant Street school), 1908
 Williams Street, 1893
 White Elementary School

History

Before 1900 
On November 26, 1869, the Atlanta City Council passed an ordinance establishing the Atlanta Public Schools. On January 31, 1872, the first three grammar schools for white students (Crew Street School, Ivy Street School, Walker Street School) opened, and the existing grammar schools for black students (Summer Hill School and Storr's School) established by the Freedman's Bureau in 1866 and supported by the Norther Missionary Socieies, were merged into the holdings of the Atlanta Public Schools. The capacity of each school was 400 students, although the inaugural registration was 1839 students, 639 students over the capacity. In addition, two high schools, divided by sex, were formed for white students, Boys High and Girls High. These initial schools were based on a census of school aged (ages 6–18) children called for by the inaugural Board of Education. That survey reported in October 1870 that there were 3,345 white children (1,540 boys and 1,805 girls) and 3,139 black children (1,421 boys and 1,728 girls) for a total potential student body of 6,484.

the districts for the white grammar schools were divided as follows,
Crew Street School, The second and third wards, including that portion of the city lying between Whitehall street and the Georgia Railroad
Ivy Street School, the fourth, fifth, and seventh wards, bounded by the Georgia Railroad and the Western & Atlantic Railroad
Walker Street School, first and sixth wards, including that portion of the city west of Whitehall street and the Western & Atlantic railroad.

The initial monetary support from the Atlanta City Council was limited. Although a bond had been called for and approved through vote by the residents, there were not yet funds and so the Board of Education had to approach the City Council to cover the purchase of the land, the construction of the buildings, the salaries of the teachers, as well as books to teach from. The first salary budget, dated December 9, 1871, was for twenty-seven teachers, and totaled $21,250. Grade school teachers were paid $450-$800 a year, while principals were paid $1,500 and the superintendent was paid $2,000.

The organization of the schools was a traditional 8-4 arrangement which consisted of 8 years of grammar school for students aged 6 to 14, and 4 years of high school for students aged 14–18. The grades began at eighth for first year students, and students progressed through to the first grade as year eight students of grammar school. The established curriculum for grammar school was, Spelling, Reading, Writing, Geography, Arithmetic (Mental and Written), Natural History, Natural Science, English Grammar, Vocal Music (it was later decided not offer this), Drawing, Composition, History, Elocution. High school curriculum was Orthography, Elocution, Grammar, Physical Geography, Natural Philosophy, Latin, Greek (boys only), Algebra, Geometry, Composition, Rhetoric, English Literature, French or German, Physiology, Chemistry, and a review of grammar school studies.

During 1872 three additional grammar schools for white students (Luckie Street, Decatur Street, and Marietta Street) and an additional grammar school for black students (Markham Street School) were instituted to meet demand. This first year saw 2,842 students served by the schools.

By 1896 there were a total of twenty-two schools, fifteen grammar schools for white students, five grammar schools for black students, and two high schools for white students.

Integration 
On August 30, 1961, nine students – Thomas Franklin Welch, Madelyn Patricia Nix, Willie Jean Black, Donita Gaines, Arthur Simmons, Lawrence Jefferson, Mary James McMullen, Martha Ann Holmes and Rosalyn Walton – became the first African American students to attend several of APS's all-white high schools.
 
On September 8, 1961, Time magazine reported:

Last week the moral siege of Atlanta (pop. 487,455) ended in spectacular fashion with the smoothest token school integration ever seen in the Deep South. Into four high schools marched nine Negro students without so much as a white catcall. Teachers were soon reporting "no hostility, no demonstrations, the most normal day we've ever had." In the lunchrooms, white children began introducing themselves to Negro children. At Northside High, a biology class was duly impressed when Donita Gaines, a Negro, was the only student able to define the difference between anatomy and physiology. Said she crisply: "Physiology has to do with functions."
 
In a 1964 news story, Time would say, "The Atlanta decision was a gentle attempt to accelerate one of the South’s best-publicized plans for achieving integration without revolution."
 
By May 1961, 300 transfer forms had been given to black students interested in transferring out of their high schools. 132 students actually applied; of those, 10 were chosen and 9 braved the press, onlookers, and insults to integrate Atlanta's all-white high schools. 
 
Brown vs. the Board of Education of Topeka had established the right of African American students to have equal opportunities in education, but it was not until 1958, when a group of African American parents challenged the segregated school system in federal court, that integration became a tangible reality for students of color in Atlanta.
 
Adding to the accolades for the students and the city, President Kennedy publicly congratulated residents during an evening address and asked other cities to "look closely at what Atlanta has done and to meet their responsibility... with courage, tolerance and above all, respect for the law."

In 2012, Atlanta Public Schools produced a documentary to honor the 50th anniversary of the district's desegregation efforts. In January 1972, in order to settle several federal discrimination and desegregation lawsuits filed on behalf of minority students, faculty, and employees and reach satisfactory agreement with Atlanta civil rights leaders who had worked over a decade for a peaceful integration plan. Atlanta Public Schools entered into a voluntary agreement with the U.S. Department of Justice, with approval and oversight from the U.S. Department of Education, in an attempt to desegregate Atlanta Public Schools. In the late 1960s and early 1970s, a majority of Atlanta Northside public schools had either token integration, or none at all. Faculty and staff assignments to schools had remained mostly segregated as well.

The justice department allowed the school system to create and use a plan consisting of partial district busing; voluntary and "M to M" (minority to majority) transfers; redrawing attendance zones; closing outdated and underutilized schools; building new schools; and mandating and implementing equal employment opportunity guidelines for hiring, training, promotion, assignment, vendor selection, bidding, contracting, construction, procurement and purchasing. The school system was also converted from a K-7 elementary and 8-12 high school grade system into a middle school 6–8 grade program beginning with the 1973/1974 school year. The curriculum was also updated to have studies more balanced, inclusive, and diverse, with content culturally and historically significant to racial minorities.

With strict guidelines, oversight and timeline implementation of the voluntary desegregation plan, the federal courts agreed not to order and enforce system-wide a mandatory busing desegregation program for APS that had been federally enforced in other cities up to that time, most notably Boston and Philadelphia which resulted in widespread anti-busing violence in 1973-74 that Atlanta civil rights leaders desired to avoid. Along with this program for racial balance, the school system's first African American Superintendent, Dr. Alonzo A. Crim, took over leadership of Atlanta Public Schools in August 1973. He remained superintendent until his retirement in 1988.

21st century

The City of Atlanta, in 2017, agreed to annex territory in DeKalb County, including the Centers for Disease Control and Emory University, effective January 1, 2018. In 2016 Emory University made a statement that "Annexation of Emory into the City of Atlanta will not change school districts, since neighboring communities like Druid Hills will still be self-determining regarding annexation." By 2017 the city agreed to include the annexed property in the boundaries of APS, a move decried by the leadership of the DeKalb County School District as it would take taxable property away from that district. In 2017 the number of children living in the annexed territory who attended public schools was nine. The area ultimately went to APS; students in the area will be rezoned to APS effective 2024; they will be zoned to DeKalb schools before then.

Cheating scandal

During the 11-year tenure of former superintendent Beverly Hall, the APS experienced unusually high gains in standardized test scores, such as the Criterion-Referenced Competency Test. In 2009, Hall won the National Superintendent of the Year Award. Around this time, the Atlanta Journal-Constitution began investigating the score increases and suggested evidence of cheating. A state report found numerous erased answers in an analysis of the 2009 test scores. Tests were administered under much higher scrutiny in 2010, and the scores dropped dramatically.

The state of Georgia launched a major investigation as cheating concerns intensified. The investigation's report, published in July 2011, found evidence of a widespread cheating scandal. At least 178 teachers and principals at 44 APS schools were alleged to have corrected students' tests to increase scores, in some cases holding "cheating parties" to revise large quantities of tests. Hall, who had retired in June 2011, expressed regret but denied any prior knowledge of, or participation in, the cheating. The new superintendent, Erroll Davis, demanded the resignation of the 178 APS employees or else they would be fired. The revelation of the scandal left many Atlantans feeling outraged and betrayed, with Mayor Kasim Reed calling it "a dark day for the Atlanta public school system." The scandal attracted national media coverage.

See also

 Truancy Intervention Project, Inc.

References

External links
 Atlanta Public Schools
 
 Atlanta Top Public Schools List 
 Atlanta Public Schools zoning locator
 U.S. Department of Education: Comprehensive School Reform Program

 
School districts in Georgia (U.S. state)
Education in Atlanta
Education in DeKalb County, Georgia
Education in Fulton County, Georgia
School districts established in 1882